Anastasia Powell is a feminist criminologist at RMIT University, Melbourne, Australia.

Career 
Powell gained her PhD in criminology from the University of Melbourne in 2008 and has been a director of Our Watch since 2016. Her doctoral research was published in the 2010 book Sex, Power and Consent: Youth Culture and the Unwritten Rules by Cambridge University Press. Powell's research specialises in policy and prevention concerning men's violence against women, with a particular focus on sexual violence and technology-facilitated abuse.

She is the author and co-author of several major Australian studies, including Australians' Attitudes to Violence Against Women: Findings from the 2013 National Community Attitudes to Violence Against Women Survey (NCAS) and More than Ready: Bystander Action to Prevent Violence Against Women in the Australian Community with the Victorian Health Promotion Foundation (VicHealth).

Powell is a co-founder of the Gendered Violence and Abuse Research Alliance (GeVARA) at RMIT University, which seeks to promote research development and collaboration in areas including sexual violence, sexual harassment, intimate partner violence, and sex-based discrimination against women. 

In addition to her scholarly contributions, Powell is regularly featured in and contributes to Australian news and media outlets, raising the profile of issues including rape culture, sexual assault, domestic violence, 'revenge porn', and sexting.

Selected bibliography
 Powell, Anastasia; Flynn, Asher; and Sugiura, Lisa (eds) (2021). The Palgrave Handbook of Gendered Violence and Technology, Basingstoke: Palgrave Macmillan
Henry, Nicola; McGlynn, Clare; Flynn, Asher; Johnson, Kelly; Powell, Anastasia; and Scott, Adrian J (2020). Image-Based Sexual Abuse: A Study on the Causes and Consequences of Non-Consensual Nude and Sexual Imagery, London; New York: Routledge.
Powell, Anastasia; and Liston, Ruth (2020). Public Feminist Criminologies: Reflections on the Activist-Scholar in Violence Against Women Policy. In The Routledge Handbook of Public Criminologies. New York: Routledge.  
Powell, Anastasia; Cameron, Robin and Stratton, Gregory (2018). Digital Criminology: Crime and Justice in Digital Society. Routledge.
Powell, Anastasia; and Sugiura, Lisa (2018). Resisting rape culture in digital society. In The Routledge International Handbook of Violence Studies (pp. 469-479). New York: Routledge.
Powell, Anastasia; and Henry, Nicola (2017). Sexual Violence in a Digital Age. Basingstoke: Palgrave Macmillan.
Powell, Anastasia (2015). ‘Seeking Rape Justice: Formal and informal responses to sexual violence through technosocial counterpublics’, Theoretical Criminology, 19(4), 571-588. doi.org/10.1177/1362480615576271
Powell, Anastasia; Henry, Nicola; and Flynn, Asher (eds). (2015). Rape Justice: Beyond the Criminal Law. Palgrave Macmillan.

References

External links
Staff Profile, at RMIT University 
Academia.edu
Our Watch
LinkedIn

Australian criminologists
Living people
Australian feminists
Australian women scientists
Year of birth missing (living people)
Feminist studies scholars
Academic staff of RMIT University
University of Melbourne alumni
Australian women criminologists